James Ojala (born May 6, 1977) is an American special effects and makeup artist, screenwriter and film director.

Career overview
Early years
Ojala grew up in Duluth, Minnesota, where he developed an early love of film through horror movies and the works of directors such as Martin Scorsese, Stanley Kubrick, George A. Romero and Buddy Giovinazzo. Following his graduation from Duluth Central High School in 1995, Ojala began his career working in public-access television. There, he and his friends created the series My Three Scums, a horror comedy sitcom about a dysfunctional family of mutants and monsters which he described as "sort of an obscene punk rock Munsters on crack". The series ran locally for three years, after which Ojala sent tapes of the show - in a large box filled with inflated helium balloons reading "I LOVE MY THREE SCUMS" - to Troma Entertainment co-founder Lloyd Kaufman, who was impressed enough by both the series and its eye-catching promotion to offer Ojala an internship on the feature film Citizen Toxie: The Toxic Avenger IV. Upon receiving the news, Ojala immediately quit his job as a medical records filing clerk and moved to New York to work on the film.

Early Hollywood career
During the production of Citizen Toxie, Ojala stepped into an open spot in the film's makeup effects department, working alongside Tim Considine of special effects company Direct FX. At the film's completion, Considine offered Ojala a full-time assisting position within his company. With Direct FX, Ojala worked on numerous features, commercials and theater, which included manufacturing an entire line of bald caps whose clients included Saturday Night Live and several Broadway productions. Ojala also worked alongside B-movie auteur Larry Fessenden on the 2001 horror film Wendigo and was involved with the Millennium Film Workshop, where he learned how to work with 16mm film under the supervision of underground filmmaker Mike Kuchar.

After the events of September 11, Ojala found it difficult to obtain any type of work in New York, eventually forcing him to seek out career options in California. Only a few days into a week-long visit to Los Angeles, Ojala was hired on the spot as a lab and on-set technician for the visual effects studio Almost Human, Inc., providing various functions including moldmaking, makeup application and puppeteering for film, commercials and television series including Buffy the Vampire Slayer, Angel and Firefly. Since leaving Almost Human in 2005, Ojala has worked with several special effects companies including Autonomous FX, Animal Makers, Spectral Motion and Legacy Effects, and has worked on mainstream productions including Hellboy II: The Golden Army, 2012, Where the Wild Things Are, Thor, X-Men: The Last Stand and Pacific Rim.

Current career
In 2005, Ojala established his own independent special effects studio and film production company Ojala Productions, specializing in makeup and creature effects for film and television as well as producing in-house projects written and directed by Ojala himself. Among others, Ojala Productions contributed special effects work for films like 2001 Maniacs: Field of Screams and the critically acclaimed Deadgirl, television shows including Tim and Eric Awesome Show, Great Job! and the music videos for Snoop Doggs Malice n Wonderland album. During this time, Ojala wrote and directed the short films The Incredible Torture Trio, which played at the TromaDance Film Festival and was later distributed internationally on a Best of TromaDance DVD compilation, the 48 Hour Film Festival entry Truthus: A Family Holiday and Marvel Zombies: The Movie, a fake trailer based on the Marvel Comics property of the same name. Marvel Zombies: The Movie drew high praise and recognition from online comics communities and eventually went viral, later being featured on the G4 pop culture news series Attack of the Show! where hosts Kevin Pereira and Chris Hardwick called it "one of the most amazing fan movies we've ever seen".

With Monty Broussard, Ojala wrote and directed the 2011 science fiction thriller short Harvest, a proposed pilot for a television or web series. The following year, Ojala was featured in Craig Chenery's book Blood Spatter: A Guide to Cinematic Zombie Violence, Gore and Special Effects and in 2013, he directed the music video for comedy punk band The Radioactive Chicken Heads "Deviled Egg", which was highlighted on horror channel Fearnet as their "Music Video of the Week". In 2016, Ojala provided make-up effects for popular indie pop band Lucius music video "Gone Insane"; the video received notable mainstream recognition, with Rolling Stone describing the effects "strange [and] striking" and the Village Voice calling them "exceptional".

Beginning in 2017, Ojala has served as co-producer for the Shudder original talk show The Core, in which he also appears as a regular on-screen guest detailing the secrets and artistry behind practical special effects.

In October 2018, after four years in production, Ojala released his first feature film as a writer-director, Strange Nature.

Filmography

As director/screenwriter

As makeup artist/special effects technician

Film

Television

Short films

References

External links
 
 Ojala Productions, Inc. homepage
 Strange Nature official website
 Duluth PACT TV interview with Strange Nature director, Jim Ojala

1977 births
American make-up artists
Living people
People from Duluth, Minnesota
Special effects people
Film directors from Minnesota
Writers from Minnesota
Artists from Minnesota